Stefu (Ștefu) is a Romanian surname. Notable people with the surname include:
 
Pompiliu Ștefu (1910–1942), Romanian typographer and communist
Vasile Stefu (born 2000), Moldovan footballer

Romanian-language surnames